Kunin may refer to:

 Kunin (surname)
 Kunin (Poland), a village in Poland
 Kunin (Ukraine) (Кунин), a village in the Ukraine
 Kunín, a village in the Czech Republic
 Kunin, Lebanon, a Lebanese municipality

See also

Kunin-Zamek, a village in east-central Poland